A Mediterranean Odyssey is a two-disc collection of the music of Canadian singer, composer and multi-instrumentalist Loreena McKennitt. The disc titled From Istanbul To Athens features a selection of previously unreleased live recordings from her 2009 Mediterranean Tour, while the disc titled The Olive And The Cedar contains previously released studio recordings selected by Loreena to complement the project's Mediterranean theme.

Track listing

Personnel
Loreena McKennitt - Vocals, Harp, Accordion, Keyboards, Piano
Clive Deamer - Drums, Percussion
Simon Edwards - Bass
Ben Grossman - Hurdy Gurdy, Percussion, Triangle
Brian Hughes - Oud, Electric Guitars, Guitar Synthesizer, Nylon String Guitar, Celtic Bouzouki
Caroline Lavelle - Cello
Hugh Marsh - Violin
Stratis Psaradellis - Greek Lute, Greek Lyra, Classical Classical Kemenche
Panos Dimitrakpolous - Kanoun
Haig Yazidjian - Oud
Jeff Wolpert - Recording and mixing
Bob Ludwig - Mastering

References 

Loreena McKennitt albums
2009 live albums